Sasha De Sola is an American ballet dancer. She is a principal dancer at the San Francisco Ballet.

Early life
De Sola  was born in Winter Park, Florida. Both of her parents are musicians. She started dancing at age 3. She trained at Kirov Academy of Ballet on full scholarship.

Career
In 2011, De Sola joined the San Francisco Ballet as an apprentice at age 17, and became a member of the corps de ballet the following year. She was named soloist in 2012 and principal dancer in 2017. She has danced roles such as Princess Aurora in The Sleeping Beauty, Titiana in A Midsummer Night's Dream, Princess/Henriette in The Little Mermaid, and Kitri in Don Quixote. She has also originated roles such as Stanton Welch's Bespoke, Dwight Rhoden's LET'S BEGIN AT THE END and Trey McIntyre’s
Your Flesh Shall Be a Great Poem

Reviewing her debut as Princess Aurora in The Sleeping Beauty, the San Francisco Chronicle wrote she “finds an emotional line through this passive character and molds steps into statements”. On a mixed bill performance which includes Bespoke and Hummingbird, The Guardian noted De Sola "transformed from the prim perfection of a pageant queen in Bespoke to earnest, lyrical dancer of Hummingbird in the time it took to change costumes."

Outside of San Francisco Ballet, De Sola has appeared in international galas in United States, Malaysia and Estonia. In 2018, a bilingual children's book based on De Sola's life, On Tiptoes - De Puntitas was published.

Selected repertoire
De Sola's repertoire with the San Francisco Ballet includes:

Awards
Silver medal - Professional Division at the World International Ballet Competition, Orlando, Florida, 2017. 
Best Junior Couple Prize - USA International Ballet Competition, Jackson, Mississippi, 2006.
Junior Division bronze medal - Varna International Ballet Competition, Varna, Bulgaria, 2006.

References

External links 
 

San Francisco Ballet principal dancers
American ballerinas
Living people
People from Winter Park, Florida
Year of birth missing (living people)
Prima ballerinas
Dancers from Florida
21st-century American ballet dancers
21st-century American women